The Rohr Saddle (el. 864 m.) is a high mountain pass in the Austrian Alps, located in the Bundesland of Lower Austria.

It connects Rohr im Gebirge and Gutenstein and has a maximum grade of 84 percent. The pass road is the Gutensteinerstraße (B 21).

See also
 List of highest paved roads in Europe
 List of mountain passes

Mountain passes of the Alps
Mountain passes of Lower Austria